Craig Farley (born 17 March 1981) is an English footballer who played in The Football League as a defender.

Career
Farley began his career at Watford where he made no first team appearances, before moving on to Colchester United. He made 14 league appearances for the U's, before being released at the end of the 1999–2000 season to join Chesham United. Later, he also made appearances for hometown club Oxford City.

References

External links

Craig Farley at Coludata.co.uk

1981 births
Living people
Footballers from Oxford
Association football defenders
English footballers
Chesham United F.C. players
Colchester United F.C. players
Oxford City F.C. players
Watford F.C. players
English Football League players